Andrew Howlett (born 15 July 1967) is a former Australian rules footballer who played for the Footscray Football Club in the Victorian Football League (VFL).

Notes

External links 
		

Living people
1967 births
Australian rules footballers from Victoria (Australia)
Western Bulldogs players